Jon Serl (1894–1993) was an American artist. He is best remembered as a  painter like the American artists Grandma Moses and Edward Hicks. He also worked in other roles and under several different names.  These included as a vaudeville artist named Slats; as a voiceover performer for Hollywood named Ned Palmer, and as a migrant fruit collector, better known under the name Jerry Palmer.

Early life
Jon Serl  was born as Josef Searls in 1894 in Olean, New York. He was the fifth child of seven.  He grew up in a vaudevillian theatrical family. This contributed to his early artistic talents, including performance, acting, dancing, singing and as a female impersonator.   Jon Serl was one of his several pseudonyms.  In his young adult days he worked as a peripatetic female impersonator performer known as "Slats".  He was called Jerry Palmer when the silent film era ended in the late 1920s with the first Sound film.  He was a voiceover artist for actors whose voices did not fit well in 'talkies'. He was Ned Palmer during the  Great Depression, a migrant fruit picker.

Lifestyle
Jon Serl lived in destitute conditions. His house was dilapidated and next to his porch there was a written sign  "CLEAN ENOUGH TO BE HEALTHY, DIRTY ENOUGH TO BE HAPPY". Paintings were piled up everywhere and mice and chickens were found around. There was no TV nor radio. Serl ranked his home as a dump, in his own words: "It's a dump, but it's a nice dump" Serl traded with Florence Kochevar, the owner of the San Gabriel property,  some of his paintings in exchange for rent.   .

Career
Jon Serl was a self-taught painter. He started painting during the World War II when he was in San Juan Capistrano, California. He wanted to decorate his house but as he was short on cash he started painting his own work. During this period he worked also in vaudeville, movies, and as a docker.

Serl started seriously painting in his mid-fifties. It started when he wanted to buy a painting for his house in San Juan Capistrano, California, but did not have the money. As a result, he started painting himself. Between 1945 and 1985 Jon Serl did more than 1200 paintings inspired by nature. He refused to exhibit for 20 years until he finally accepted to display his work in the 1970s.  His first exhibition was in 1970 when he was 76. The Los Angeles Municipal Art Gallery managed an exhibition of 41 of his works. The exhibition was titled "California primitives, authentic and of great importance".
 . At this time he was settled in Lake Elsinore, a desert town in California.
In 1981, the Newport Harbor Art Museum also organized an exposition named "Psychological Paintings: The Personal Vision of Jon Serl". His work is now exposed in permanent collections in several museums including the Smithsonian American Art Museum and the American Folk Art Museum

Painting style
Jon Serl painted in oil paint on a found surface. He mainly painted characters that were known to be expressionistic and complex, but also brash and bold. It was part of his trademark, which also included the long elegant arms, clownish expressions, and large eyes. Because of his vaudeville childhood, his canvases were often compared to theatrical stages. His works explored the inner and the outer worlds with a strange narrative, which usually expressed dualities such as female against male, good against evil, or nature against technology.

Jon Serl was categorized as prolific. This might be due to the fact that he began painting at a late age.

Theatrical and movie career
Jon Serl was born in a theatrical family. When he was a child he enjoyed performing on stage with his sister. Later, in 1937, when he was 39 he moved to Laguna Beach and began to write screenplays for Hollywood. Jon Serl was also a voiceover artist for silent film actors who could not make the transition to the talkies. When World War Two started, he left the United States and went to Canada, where he worked as a forest guard. He used his spare time to paint. When he went back to Laguna Beach after the war, he worked odd jobs and spent all his spare time painting.

Artwork
One of the most famous paintings of Jon Serl is Between Two Worlds painted in 1982. It is a seductive painting. The central character stands in the middle wearing a blue dress with his hands gnarled, seeming in pain. Even if the figure is wearing a dress, the figure is a male. His pain seems to come from the fact that everyone in the painting is watching him. His hands and his screaming mouth reflect a tortured face. The two worlds referenced in the title are represented one in a pale bubble and the other one in the darker landscape bordering the central activity. There are many faces overhead the blue character; they are terrifying him. This creates a haunted feeling. Jon Serl spent time on details to create distorted faces and a confused atmosphere around the central figure. Serl succeeded to show the drama in this painting, which is why it is one of Serl's best artwork.

Solo exhibitions
 2013, Jon Serl: The Mutuality of Being. Natalie and James Thompson Art Gallery, Department of Art and Art History, San Jose State University, San Jose, California
 1994, Jon Serl: One Man By Himself, Art Alliance Gallery, Riverside Art Museum, Riverside, California
 1981, Psychological Paintings: The Personal Vision of Jon Serl, Newport Harbor Art Museum, Newport Beach, California

Group exhibitions

 2013, Great and Mighty Things: Outsider Art from the Sheldon and Jill Bonovitz Collection, Philadelphia Museum of Art
 2012, Accidental Genius: Art From the Anthony Petullo Collection, Milwaukee Art Museum, Milwaukee
 2004, Golden Blessings of Old Age, American Visionary Art Museum, Baltimore
 1999, Aliens Among Us, Visionary Art Museum, Baltimore
 1986, Muffled Voices: Folk Artists in Contemporary America, PaineWebber Art Gallery & Museum of American Folk Art, New York

Books

"Jon Serl: The Mutuality of Being." San Jose: Natalile and James Thompson Art Gallery, 2013 was produced in conjunction with the exhibition of the same title that took place at San Jose State University in the spring of 2013. It includes an introduction by Jo Farb Hernandez, Gallery Director and Exhibition Curator, as well as essays by Cara Zimmerman, co-editor of the 2013 book "Great and Mighty Things:" Outsider Art from the Jill and Sheldon Bonovitz Collection, and Randall Morris of the Cavin-Morris Gallery in New York, and Serl's longtime gallerist and friend. A full bio and bibliography are included, along with 71 full-color images of Serl's work and four archival photographs.

On January 1, 1995, West Stockbridge, MA: Hard Press, Inc., 1995 published "One Man by Himself: Portraits of Jon Serl by Sam Messer. Essays by Denis Johnson and Red Lips, All Handwritten Quotes from the Mouth of Jon Serl". This book includes a narrative by Denis Johnson describing the painting encounters between both artists, as well as Jon Serl's quotes.

Later on, published by Hard Press Editions with its first edition on December 25, 1995, "One Man by Himself (Profile Series)" by Sam Messer presents a total of 25 sensitive portraits of Jon Serl. From his daily habits to his thoughts, Messer's paintings show the obstinate personality of the American painter.

Sam Messer
Artist Sam Messer met Jon Serl in December 1990. At this time Serl was 96. Messer was driven to the artist because of his famous self-taught paintings; an artist himself, he wanted to learn about Serl's life and paint him. Meetings between the artists became common almost every week until Serl's death in 1993. Through these years almost fifty portraits of Jon Serl were painted and then published in the book "One Man by Himself".
Messer said that Jon Serl was a role model for him. He said that Jon Serl completely regenerates his painting practice and that he was also a part of his rebirth as a person.

Quotes

 "If it weren't for my painting I would have died a long time ago." 
 "It is this fundamental import that is captured in the portrait. If I don't use the paint it cries." 
 "They wanted fifty cents for it," Serl said. "I didn't have fifty cents, so I painted my own."
 "It's a good way to live. You get tired of living the sissy way, pushing buttons."
 "There's no TV, no radio, you have to invent for yourself."

References

1894 births
1993 deaths
20th-century American painters
American male painters
People from Olean, New York
Painters from New York (state)
Folk artists
Vaudeville performers
American male screenwriters
Screenwriters from New York (state)
20th-century American male writers
20th-century American screenwriters
20th-century American male artists